Sataspes is a genus of moths in the family Sphingidae erected by Frederic Moore in 1858. They are mimics of carpenter bees.

Species
Sataspes cerberus Semper, 1896
Sataspes infernalis (Westwood, 1847)
Sataspes javanica Roepke, 1941
Sataspes leyteana Brechlin & Kitching, 2009
Sataspes negrosiana Brechlin & Kitching, 2009
Sataspes ribbei Rober, 1885
Sataspes scotti Jordan, 1926
Sataspes tagalica Boisduval, 1875
Sataspes xylocoparis Butler, 1875

References

 
Smerinthini
Moth genera
Taxa named by Frederic Moore